Fabio Zerpa (4 December 1928, Rosario, Uruguay – 7 August 2019) was a Uruguayan actor, parapsychologist and UFO researcher. He resided in Argentina from 1951 on.

Biography
Fabio Zerpa arrived in Argentina in 1951. Following a short theatrical career, he became increasingly interested in extraterrestrial life, having already studied psychology. After some years of investigation, Zerpa started to give his first conferences at the beginning of the 1960s. In 1966 he created the radio program Más allá de la cuarta dimensión (Beyond the Fourth Dimension). Since then, Fabio Zerpa reported on more than 3,000 cases of UFO sightings and alleged contact with extraterrestrials. From 2001 he was the director of the on-line magazine El Quinto Hombre (The Fifth Man).

Bibliography
 Un hombre en el Universo  (A Man In The Universe, Cielosur – Argentina – 1975)
 El OVNI y sus misterios  (UFO And Its Mysteries, Nauta – Spain – 1976)
 Dos científicos viajan en OVNI  (Two Scientists Travel By UFO, Cielosur – Argentina – 1977)
 Los Hombres De Negro y los OVNI (Men In Black And UFO, Plaza & Janes – Spain – 1977)(Reedited by Planeta – Argentina in 1989)
 El reino subterráneo (The Underground Kingdom, Planeta – Argentina – 1990)
 El mundo de las vidas anteriores  (The World Of Past Lives, Planeta – Argentina – 1991)
 Apertura de lo insólito (Opening of the Unusual, Club de Lectores – Argentina – 1991)
 Predicciones de la Nueva Era (Predictions Of The New Age, CS – 1992)
 La vida desde adentro (Life From The Inside, Beas – 1993)
 Los OVNIs existen y son extraterrestres (UFOs Exists And They Are Alien, Planeta – Argentina – 1994/5)
 Ellos, los seres extraterrestres (They, The Alien Beings, Ameghino – 1996)
 Los verdaderos Hombres De Negro  (The Real Men In Black, Ameghino – 1997)
 Predicciones para el nuevo siglo (Predictions For The New Century, H&H Editors – 1999)
 El Nostradamus de América – (Americas' Nostradamus, Ediciones Continente – 2003)

References

External links

1928 births
Parapsychologists
People from Rosario, Uruguay
UFO writers
Ufologists
Uruguayan expatriates in Argentina
Uruguayan male writers
Uruguayan essayists
2019 deaths